Osborne House is a historic home located at Victor in Ontario County, New York, USA. It is a two story with full attic Italian Villa style dwelling built about 1855. Surmounting the hip roof is a notable cupola. Contributing structures on the property are a carriage barn, smokehouse, corn crib, and chicken house.

It was listed on the National Register of Historic Places in 1980.

References

Houses on the National Register of Historic Places in New York (state)
Houses completed in 1855
Houses in Ontario County, New York
National Register of Historic Places in Ontario County, New York